Zygi Jon Kamasa (born 12 November 1969) is a Swedish-British entertainment studio executive and film executive producer.

As Group CEO of MARV, partnering with director and producer Matthew Vaughn, Kamasa oversees the expansion of the Kingsman franchise as well as global sales, marketing and distribution of MARV's films, TV series and merchandising.

He served as CEO of Lionsgate UK & Europe until July 2020 and was the Executive Producer for Brooklyn, Eddie the Eagle, Salmon Fishing in the Yemen, The Railway Man and London Has Fallen.

Career 

Kamasa was educated at Highgate School until 1987  and started his film career in 1993 as Founder and Managing Director of TV production company Scorpio Productions, based at Pinewood Studios. In 1998, he co-founded with Simon Franks, the independent film distribution company Redbus Film, producing and distributing films in the UK including Bend It Like Beckham and Good Night, and Good Luck.

In October 2005, Redbus Film was sold to Lionsgate Entertainment for $35 million and became Lionsgate UK in February 2006.

As CEO of Lionsgate UK & Europe, Kamasa oversaw the investment, production and distribution of UK Top Ten Box office films including three installments of The Hunger Games franchise, The Expendables and its sequels The Expendables 2 and 3, Kathryn Bigelow’s Oscar-winning Hurt Locker and action film Olympus Has Fallen and its sequel London Has Fallen. He also led UK distribution for Deepwater Horizon and La La Land.

Kamasa's credits as Executive Producer of UK films include Salmon Fishing in the Yemen, starring Ewan McGregor and Emily Blunt, The Railway Man, starring Colin Firth and Nicole Kidman, A Little Chaos, starring Kate Winslet and Alan Rickman, Eddie the Eagle, starring Taron Egerton and Hugh Jackman and Brooklyn, starring Saoirese Ronan.

In May 2015, Zygi Kamasa announced that Lionsgate intended to finance and co-invest in up to 25 British independent films between 2015 and 2019.

References

External links
 

1969 births
Living people
People educated at Highgate School